Joseph Plachutta, (13 May 1827 in Zadar, Austrian Empire, today's Croatia – 22 July 1883) also called Josef Plachutta or Josip Plahuta, was a Slovene descent chess problemist and chess player, known for his famous problem with the Plachutta theme.

Solution:

1.Qf3! (threat 2.d4 mate)

1...Nxc5 2.Rg7! (this is the actual Plachutta. threats 3.Qg3 and 3.Bc7)

2...Rgxg7 3.Bc7+ Rxc7 4.Qg3#

2...Rhxg7 3. Qg3+ Rxg3 4.Bc7#

External links
 Plachutta problems on PDB Server

1827 births
1883 deaths
Chess composers
Sportspeople from Zadar
Austrian people of Slovenian descent